The men's madison competition at the 2023 UEC European Track Championships was held on 12 February 2023.

Results
200 laps (50 km) with 20 sprints were raced.

References

Men's madison
European Track Championships – Men's madison